Peter Neville Macken (born 10 November 1938 in Sydney, Australia) is an Australian modern pentathlete and fencer who competed in five Olympic Games. He competed in the modern pentathlon at all five Olympics from 1960 to 1976 and in fencing at the 1968 Olympics.

His best position was fourth at the 1964 Olympics Modern Pentathlon.

See also
 List of athletes with the most appearances at Olympic Games
 Dual sport and multi-sport Olympians

References

External links
 

1938 births
Living people
Modern pentathletes at the 1960 Summer Olympics
Modern pentathletes at the 1964 Summer Olympics
Modern pentathletes at the 1968 Summer Olympics
Modern pentathletes at the 1972 Summer Olympics
Modern pentathletes at the 1976 Summer Olympics
Fencers at the 1968 Summer Olympics
Australian male fencers
Australian male modern pentathletes
Olympic fencers of Australia
Olympic modern pentathletes of Australia
Sportspeople from Sydney
20th-century Australian people